Cingireddi Narayana Reddy (29 July 1931 – 12 June 2017), popularly known as CiNaRe, was an Indian Telugu-language poet and writer. Reddy had produced over eighty literary works including poems, prose-plays, lyrical plays, translations, and ghazals. He was also a professor, film lyricist, actor, and Rajya Sabha politician. Reddy was awarded the Jnanpith Award by the Government of India in 1988, and he served as the Vice Chancellor of Telugu University.

He ventured into the film industry as a lyricist with the 1962 film Gulebakavali Katha. Subsequently, he penned the lyrics for more than 3,500 songs and won two state Nandi Awards for Best Lyricist.

Early life and career
Cingireddi Narayana Reddy was born on 29 July 1931 in the village of Hanumajipet in present-day Telangana to a Telugu family of Malla Reddy and Buchamma. His father was a farmer and his mother was a housewife. After completing his higher secondary education, he went on to study at the Osmania University, Hyderabad in 1949. Reddy studied in Urdu medium until his graduation as education in Telugu was not available under Nizam's rule. He took Telugu as his subject during his graduation. Reddy received his Master of Arts degree in 1954 and became a college lecturer in 1955. He received Ph.D. in 1962 on "Modern Traditions of Telugu" and became a professor in 1976.

He did his primary, secondary and higher secondary in Urdu medium. He studied Telugu privately during schooling in Sircilla under the guidance and tutelage of Gurus Satavadhani Seshadri Ramana Kavulu of Machilipatnam. He was mentored by the legendary poet and Jnanpith awardee Kavi Samrat Viswanatha Satyanarayana of Vijayawada, the first principal of Karimnagar Government College (1959–61). After completing his primary and secondary education at his hometown, he moved to Hyderabad to pursue his degree education. He learned of the Modern Telugu literary giants and read books written by Gurram Jashua, Sri Sri, Devulapalli Krishna Sastry.

Naryana Reddy married Suseela and with her had four daughters. Reddy instituted an award named after his wife which is presented annually to the female writers. Reddy was nominated to the Rajya Sabha, the upper house of the Indian Parliament, in August 1997.

Literary works
Reddy's first published work was a poetry collection Navvani Puvvu (The Bashful Flower) in 1953 and later went on to publish several other works like Vennela Vada (The Monnlight Town, 1959), Jalapatam (The Waterfall), Divvela Muvvalu (Candle Bells, 1959), Ritu Chakram (Cycle of Seasons, 1964), Madhyataragati Mandahasam (The Smile of the Middle Class, 1968), and Mantalu Manavudu (Flames and the Man, 1970). His 1980 published poetic work Viswambhara (The Earth) received wide critical acclaim and has been translated into several Indian languages. The Sahitya Akademi appreciated it as "monumental work in free verse depicts the journey of man through the ages as he strives to attain spiritual, artistic, and scientific excellence."

Reddy's Nagarjuna Sagaram is a Buddhist epic poetry based on a heart-breaking love story of a lady Santisri who comes to study Buddhism and falls in love with a sculptor Padmadeva. His 1957 Karpura Vasantha Rayulu was an epic poem retelling the romance between the King Kumara Giri of Reddy dynasty and his court dancer Lakuma. The book was dedicated to Telugu historian Mallampalli Somasekhara Sarma whose main contributions were regarding the recording of Reddy history.

Bhimsen Nirmal translated Vishwambhara into Hindi as Viswambhara and his Telugu poetry collection Prapanchapadulu was translated into Sanskrit as Prapanchapadi by R. Sri Hari. Nirmal and Hari won the Sahitya Akademi Translation Award for these works in 1991 and 2001 respectively.

Along with poetry, Reddy also composed musical plays Ramappa (1960), based on Kakatiya dynasty and the collection of ten plays Narayana Reddy Natikalu (Play-lets of Narayana Reddy, 1978). He published analysis of modern Telugu poetry, its precursors, its progression through various phases and its modern-day forms in Adhunikandhara Kavitamu - Sampradayamulu Prayogamalu: Modern Telugu Poetry Tradition and Experiment. His 1997 published book Matti Manishi Akasam (Man Beyond Earth and Sky) consists of a long poem of around hundred pages. He wrote a few travelogues about his travels to various countries including a tour of Malaysia in Muchataga Moodu Varalu, about Russia in Soviet Russsialo Padi Rojulu and about the United States, Canada, the United Kingdom, and France in Paschatya Desallo Yabai Rojulu.

Reddy's first film as a lyricist was Gulebakavali Katha (1962) which was directed by Kamalakara Kameswara Rao. Reddy later went on to write more than 3000 film songs. His last song was for the movie Inkennallu (2011) which was directed by Syed Rafi.

Bibliography
The following literary works of Reddy have been published:

 Jalapatam (1953)
 Navvani Puvvu (1953)
 Viswageeti (1954)
 Nagarjuna Sagaram (1955)
 Narayana Reddy Geyalu (1955)
 Ajantha Sundhari (1955)
 Swapna Bhangam (1957)
 Karpura Vasantarayalu (1957)
 Tene Patalu (1957)
 Viswanatha Nayudu (1959)
 Divvela Muvvalu (1959)
 Vennelawada (1959)
 Geya Natikalu (1959)
 Vachnakavitha (Cini Kavi Manasnivali) (1959)
 Ramappa (1960)
 Cinare Geethalu (1963)
 Ritu Chakram (1964)
 Sama Darshanam (1964)
 Aksharala Gavakshalu (1965)
 Vyasavhahini (1965)
 Jati Ratnam (1967)
 Adhunikandhra Kavitvam (1967)
 Sampradaya Reethulu (1967)
 Madhyataragati Mandahasam (1968)
 Maro Harivillu (1969)
 Gandhiyam (1969)
 Meerabai (1969)
 Mantalu - Manavudu (1970)
 Mukhamuki (1971)
 Manisi - Chilaka (1972)
 Mandhara Makarandhalu (1973)
 Patalo Emindi - Na Matalo Emundhi (First Volume) (1974)
 Patalo Emindi - Na Matalo Emundhi (Second Volume) (1974)
 Marpu Na Tirpu (1974)
 Sikharalu Loyalu (1974)
 Tejassu Na Tapassu (1975)
 Taratarala Telugu Velugu (1975)
 Pagale Vennela (1976)
 Inti Peru Chaitanyam (1976)
 Bhoomika (1977)
 Narayana Reddy Natikalu (1978)
 Mathaanam (1978)
 Mruthuvu Nunchi (1979)
 Muthyala Kokila (1979)
 Viswambhara (1980)
 Soviat Rashyalo Padi Rojulu (1980)
 Maa Uru Matladindi (1980)
 Rekkalu (1982)
 Amara Veerudu Bhagatising (1982)
 Nadaka Na Talli (1983)
 Kalam Anchu Mida (1985)
 Telugu Gazallu (1986)
 Kavitha Na Chirunama (1988)
 Arohana (1991)
 Jathiki Upiri Swathantryam (1993)
 Drukpatham (1994)
 Bhoogolamanta Manishi Bomma (1996)
 Matti Manishi Aakasham (1997)
 Gadilo Samudram (1998)
 Vyaktitvam (1999)
 Dooraalanu Doosukotchi (2000)
 Muchataga Mudu Vharalu (2001)
 Prachatya Deshaloo Yabai Rojulu (2001)
 Samooham Vaipu (2008)
 Manisiga Jeevinchalani (2009)
 Viswam Nlo Unnapudu (2010)
 Nachoopu Repati Vaipu (2011)
 Vakkuku Vayasu Ledu (2012)
 Lethakiranalu (2013)
 Alalerthe Adugulu (2013)
 Ningikegire Chetlu (2014)
 Cinare Gazallu
 Prapanchapadulu
 Kalam Sakshiga
 Udayam Na Hridayam
 Jathiya Kavi Sammelanamloni - Veevida Bhasha Kavithala - Anuvaadhalu
 Telugukavitha Layathmakatha
 Saptati Oka Liptaga
 Moving Spirit
 Rekkala Santhakalu
 Jwalaga Gevenchalani
 Konagotimida Geevitham
 Kalisi Nadiche Kalam
 Evi A Jeeva Nidhulu
 That's What I'said (English)

Discography 
Sources:

Award
Reddy won several awards for his literary work which includes the Sahitya Akademi Award in 1973 for his poetry collection Mantalu Manavudu, the Jnanpith Award for Viswambhara in 1988 and was conferred with the Sahitya Academy fellowship in 2014, the highest honour of the Sahitya Academy, India's National Academy of Letters. Reddy was also awarded an honorary Kala Prapoorna by Andhra University in 1978, the Soviet Land Nehru award in 1982, and the Raja-Lakshmi Award by the Sri Raja-Lakshmi Foundation in 1988, "Visishta Puraskaram" of the Potti Sriramulu Telugu University in 2011. The Government of India honored him with the fourth and third highest civilian awards, Padma Shri (1977) and Padma Bhushan (1992).

He also won the Nandi Award for Best Lyricist twice for the song "Kantene Amma Ani Ante Ela?" from the movie Preminchu (2001) and "Idigo Raayalaseema Gadda" from the movie Seetayya (2003).

Death
Reddy developed health complication and complained of chest pain and was shifted to the Care Hospital. He died on 12 June 2017 at the age of 85.

References

https://www.loc.gov/acq/ovop/delhi/salrp/reddy.html

External links
 

1931 births
2017 deaths
Indian lyricists
People from Telangana
Telugu-language lyricists
Telugu writers
Recipients of the Padma Shri in literature & education
Recipients of the Jnanpith Award
Recipients of the Sahitya Akademi Award in Telugu
20th-century Indian writers
People from Karimnagar district
Nominated members of the Rajya Sabha
Recipients of the Padma Bhushan in literature & education
20th-century Indian male writers